Cephaloticoccus capnophilus  is a Gram-negative and non-motile bacterium from the genus of Cephaloticoccus which has been isolated from the gut of the ant Cephalotes varians from the Crocodile Lake National Wildlife Refuge in Florida in the United States.

References

External links
Type strain of Cephaloticoccus capnophilus at BacDive -  the Bacterial Diversity Metadatabase

https://lpsn.dsmz.de/species/cephaloticoccus-capnophilus 

 

Verrucomicrobiota
Bacteria described in 2016